Miguel Ángel Hoyos Guzmán (born March 11, 1981 in Santa Cruz de la Sierra) in a Bolivian former football defender who last played for Nacional Potosí.

Club career
Hoyos began his career with hometown club Oriente Petrolero where he played as a starter between 2002 and 2006. The following year he went to The Strongest on a loan. In 2008, he returned to Oriente to play for another season. Subsequently, Hoyos awoke the interest of popular club Bolívar and he agreed to join the team for the 2009 season, on 21 September 2009 he was suspended after testing positive for dexamethasone in a anti-doping test. He signed for Israeli side Hapoel Tel Aviv on 22 January 2010, but on 26 January 2010 just 4 days after he signed for club the team decided to release him. On 2 February he signed for Bolivian side Oriente Petrolero again.

Doping case
Hoyos was tested positive for use of a banned substance after a national team game against Venezuela in June 2009, in which game he clashed heads with Ronald García. He was cleared to play again by CONMEBOL in October 2009 after it was declared the injection used was aimed to help ease the sustained head injury.

International career
Hoyos has earned a total of 28 caps for the Bolivia national team with one goal scored between 2002 and 2011. He represented his country in 9 FIFA World Cup qualification matches.

International goals
Scores and results list Bolivia's goal tally first.

Honours

Club
 Oriente Petrolero
 Liga de Fútbol Profesional Boliviano: 2004 (C)
 Bolívar
 Liga de Fútbol Profesional Boliviano: 2009 (A)

References

External links
 
 Profile
 

1981 births
Living people
Sportspeople from Santa Cruz de la Sierra
Association football fullbacks
Bolivian footballers
Bolivia international footballers
Oriente Petrolero players
The Strongest players
Club Bolívar players
Hapoel Tel Aviv F.C. players
Club San José players
Israeli Premier League players
Bolivian expatriate footballers
Expatriate footballers in Israel
2004 Copa América players
2007 Copa América players
2011 Copa América players
Bolivian sportspeople in doping cases
Doping cases in association football